Myrtle Avenue is a  street that runs from Duffield Street in Downtown Brooklyn to Jamaica Avenue in Richmond Hill, Queens, in New York City, United States.

Route description

Queens
Myrtle Avenue has been a major thoroughfare since the early 19th century, named after the myrtle trees that were plentiful in the area. Most likely, Myrtle Avenue began in Queens and was a plank road that charged a toll. The road eventually hosted the Knickerbocker Stage Coach Line, that ran stagecoach and omnibus services. After World War I, Myrtle Avenue in Glendale was a popular destination for picnickers. With a steam trolley running on the avenue, and its ample adjacent beer gardens and park space, people from as far as Eastern Brooklyn came to Myrtle. In the mid-1920s, the parks closed as a result of Prohibition. Ultimately, the parks became incorporated by the city into what is known today as Forest Park.

Currently, Myrtle Avenue is one of the primary shopping strips of Ridgewood, along with Fresh Pond Road whose south end is at Myrtle Avenue. It is also the primary shopping strip in nearby Glendale, although this stretch of Myrtle Avenue is not as busy as the Ridgewood stretch. It was also home to the Ridgewood Theatre, which was the longest continuously operated theater in the United States, having operated for 91 years before its closure in March 2008.

Myrtle Avenue is the starting point for several major thoroughfares in Queens that were built later. This includes Union Turnpike, whose west end is in Glendale just west of Woodhaven Boulevard, and Hillside Avenue, which starts off from Myrtle Avenue in Richmond Hill near Lefferts Boulevard.

Brooklyn
In the neighborhoods of Fort Greene and Clinton Hill, the development of Myrtle Avenue was directly related to the Brooklyn Navy Yard, built in 1801. In 1847 Fort Greene Park, Brooklyn's first park, was built on the south side of western Myrtle Avenue. During World War II, the Navy Yard employed more than 71,000 people, many of them African American shipbuilders. As a result, the demand for housing in the area increased, prompting the New York City Housing Authority to build the Walt Whitman and Raymond Ingersoll public housing on Myrtle Avenue in 1944.

By the early 1970s the vitality of Myrtle Avenue began to decline, mainly because of the decommissioning of the Brooklyn Navy Yard and the curtailing of the elevated railway. At its nadir of decline, the street became known to many Brooklynites as "Murder Avenue".

In the 1990s the western end of Myrtle Avenue was closed from Jay Street to Flatbush Avenue Extension to create the pedestrian-only MetroTech Center. Adding to the MetroTech Center's revitalization of the neighborhood, a modern revitalization movement is in effect by a collaboration of community organizations like the Myrtle Avenue Revitalization Project LDC (MARP), the Myrtle Avenue Brooklyn Improvement district BID, and the Myrtle Avenue Merchants Association. Some parts of Myrtle Avenue, for example around Pratt Institute, have become a main street of commerce with many trendy restaurants and boutique retail shops.

Transportation

The  currently runs above Myrtle Avenue through Bushwick and a small stretch through Bedford-Stuyvesant. Formerly, the Myrtle Avenue El was an elevated railroad line that ran along Myrtle Avenue. The completed line ran from Middle Village to Downtown Brooklyn and Park Row, Manhattan, using the avenue for most of its route. Since 1969, the portion of the line west of the Myrtle Avenue – Broadway station was demolished, while the rest of the line east of the Myrtle Avenue - Broadway station remains.

Myrtle Avenue is currently served by the following subway stations, west to east:
 Myrtle–Willoughby Avenues
 Myrtle Avenue
 Central Avenue
 Knickerbocker Avenue
 Myrtle–Wyckoff Avenues; a station complex consisting of:
 Myrtle–Wyckoff Avenues
 Myrtle–Wyckoff Avenues

Also, DeKalb Avenue and 121st Street are stations near the avenue. There is an abandoned subway station on the BMT Brighton Line directly under Myrtle Avenue; it was closed in 1957 due to a track reconfiguration north of DeKalb Avenue.

Two bus routes primarily serve the avenue. The Queens stretch of Myrtle Avenue is served by the  bus line. The Brooklyn stretch of Myrtle Avenue is served by the  bus line. In addition, several bus routes serve the avenue at the Ridgewood Intermodal Terminal near Myrtle–Wyckoff Avenues subway station.

In popular culture
There are references to Myrtle Avenue in hip-hop culture and rap music, reflective of the street passing through African American neighborhoods in Brooklyn. The popularity of the nickname "Murder Avenue" dates back to the minor 1993 hit of the same name by the Geto Boys.

Other artists that mention Myrtle Avenue include:
 Nas refers to Willoughby and Myrtle Ave in the song "Virgo" with Ludacris and Doug E. Fresh.
 Prodigy from Mobb Deep references Myrtle in "Trife Life" on The Infamous album.
 Mos Def says he's from Myrtle and Broadway in the song "Champion Requiem" on The New Danger, and in the song "Mathematics" on Black on Both Sides.
 Talib Kweli references the street in the Black Eyed Peas' song "Like That" - "Like a caribou running down myrtle avenue".
 Digable Planets reference the avenue in the song "9th Wonder (Blackitolism)" when Butterfly rhymes - "Myrtle Ave A Train got the pick in my hair".
 Prince Paul references Myrtle Avenue in his song "People, Places & Things".
 Lord Jamar refers to Myrtle Avenue in the Brand Nubian song "Straight Off Tha Head"
 Henry Miller in Tropic of Capricorn wrote about the horrible conditions of Myrtle Avenue.
Tory Lanez references Myrtle Ave as the birthplace of a character in his song "Pieces" from his album Memories Don't Die.
Floating Points references Myrtle Avenue, Hounslow is his song “Myrtle Avenue”
Mxmtoon released a song in 2020 entitled "Myrtle Ave"

References

External links

 Brooklyn Bites: Neighborhood Dining Guide for Myrtle Avenue in GO Brooklyn
 Robert Gerhard. Myrtle avenue. Street Shooters of May 2018

Streets in Brooklyn
Streets in Queens, New York
Bedford–Stuyvesant, Brooklyn
Clinton Hill, Brooklyn
Bushwick, Brooklyn
Ridgewood, Queens